Apeton is a village in Staffordshire, England. It is located in the region of the West Midlands. At the 2011 census, the population was 915.

External links 
 

Villages in Staffordshire